Pretty Maids All in a Row is a 1971 American sexploitation film that is part black comedy, part sex comedy, and part murder mystery. Starring Rock Hudson, Angie Dickinson, and Telly Savalas, it was released on April 28, 1971. Roger Vadim directed the film, and Gene Roddenberry produced and wrote the screenplay based on a 1968 novel by Francis Pollini.

The film was Roddenberry's only feature film writing credit.

Plot 
In Oceanfront High School, a (fictitious) American high school, at the height of the sexual revolution, young female students are being targeted by an unknown serial killer. Meanwhile, a male student called Ponce is experiencing sexual frustration, surrounded by a seemingly unending stream of beautiful and sexually provocative classmates.

Michael "Tiger" McDrew (Hudson) is the high school's football coach and guidance counselor, but there is another aspect of Tiger's character; he has sexual encounters with a number of female students.

In class Ponce instantly takes a shine to a single substitute teacher named Miss Smith (Dickinson) and presents his report on John Milton's Paradise Lost. Tiger understanding Ponce's sexual life during the school break tries to befriend Ponce, and help him deal with his sexual needs by encouraging him to seek the affections of Miss Smith. Later Tiger talks to Miss Smith showing her a profile of Ponce and that he has amazing potential but has a hang up when it comes to sexual education. Tiger recommends that Miss Smith teach Ponce in building confidence.

After school Miss Smith takes Ponce to her home where they discuss what he thinks about English poet John Milton. Ponce describes Milton's Paradise Lost as the way Lucifer was expelled from Heaven, and his evolution into the Devil, avenging himself by corrupting God's finest creation, Mankind. Miss Smith tantalizes Ponce by reading him some of Milton's poems. When they go to make some hot chocolate Ponce flees into the closet. Miss Smith convinces him to come out where she then reveals that she knows about his sexual problem and that she invited him to her house to talk about it with him.

The next day in school Miss Smith informs Tiger of her progress with Ponce and of the boy's obvious attraction to her. Tiger tells Miss Smith that with her next meeting she has to do a more informative assessment about Ponce. Tiger supposedly shows a technique by fondling Miss Smith to ensure what they do is not with emotions but with an analytic mind and observation hence it won't be sexual at all, and tells her that he wants to know what exactly triggers Ponce. All this makes Miss Smith riled up.

Following Tiger's suggestion, later that night Ponce goes around to Miss Smith's house to deliver a liquor-filled chocolate duck as a present accidentally giving her his keys in the process. Ponce confides in Miss Smith, telling her that his father is dead and apologizes for yesterday. Ponce then leaves Miss Smith who finds his keys in the wrapping of the liquor-filled chocolate duck but doesn't call him back.

Ponce comes back not long after as he had to get his keys. Clad only in a night dress, Miss Smith invites him in telling him to retrace his steps to find them again. She sits him down on the sofa telling him that she can't sleep and puts on a music record. Miss Smith invites Ponce to dance with her until she's tired. Ponce and Miss Smith start to dance during which Miss smith pulls open one of her knots of her night dress's shoulder straps.

When Ponce tries to retie it Miss Smith feigns surprise asking him if he is undressing her to which Ponce denies. Miss Smith then kisses Ponce passionately which he returns. This results in Ponce breaking the chocolate duck open covering his trousers with the liquor within it.

Miss Smith takes Ponce into the bathroom where she washes his trousers in the sink while he takes a bath. She leaves his trousers to soak before she begins washing him. Miss Smith helps Ponce out of the bath, hands him a towel to wrap around himself then kisses him. The next morning Ponce and Miss Smith are lying naked and have sex before heading off to school.

Meanwhile, one young girl after another turns up dead. A police detective captain, Sam Surcher (Telly Savalas), investigates the case but never obtains enough evidence to make an arrest. Tiger is suspected, but never caught red-handed. Ponce, however, learns that Tiger is guilty when he discovers evidence hidden in his office. Tiger drives Ponce to a pier and confesses, and apparently commits suicide by driving his car into the ocean with Ponce as his witness. However, Surcher suspects that Tiger has faked his own death, a suspicion that is reinforced when he notices that Tiger's supposed widow has a plane ticket to Brazil.

After Tiger's funeral, a far bolder and much more confident Ponce engages to flirting with several of the surviving female students, taking one for a ride on his moped.

Cast

 Rock Hudson as Michael "Tiger" McDrew
 Angie Dickinson as Betty Smith
 Telly Savalas as Police Captain Sam Surcher
 John David Carson as Ponce de Leon Harper
 Keenan Wynn as Police Chief John Poldaski
 Barbara Leigh as Jean McDrew, Tiger's wife
 Roddy McDowall as Mr. Proffer, the principal
 James Doohan as Follo
 William Campbell as Grady
 Susan Tolsky as Miss Harriet Craymire

The "Pretty Maids:"
 Brenda Sykes as Pamela Wilcox, an African American student
 Joy Bang as Rita
 Gretchen Burrel as Marjorie
 Joanna Cameron as Yvonne Millick, a dark-haired student
 Aimee Eccles as Hilda Lee, an Asian American student
 June Fairchild as Sonny Swangle, an always-laughing student
 Margaret Markov as Polly
 Diane Sherry as Sheryl

Cast notes:
This film was John David Carson's feature film debut.
Dawn Roddenberry, producer Gene Roddenberry's daughter, has a bit part in the film as "Girl #1".

Production
The novel was published in 1968. Producer Jay Weston and director James B. Harris originally optioned the novel and assigned William Hanley to write the script. Joe Namath was meant to star as the football coach. Eventually Gene Roddenberry rewrote the script and came on board as producer; the job of directing was given to Roger Vadim – his first movie in two years. "There is no role in the film for Jane Fonda" said the director, who was estranged from his wife at the time.

It was Vadim's first American film, though he said he had received offers before – a contract ten years previously with Paramount for five films, and one with Metro-Goldwyn-Mayer (MGM) three years earlier. He said he had bought himself out of both contracts because he could not get the necessary control. Vadim said he had to be persuaded to return to MGM:

It seemed this time they (MGM) were more interested to give more credit to the director. 'We have changed' they said. But from the moment I get here I fight like hell. They want names but they don't want to pay for them. For the first time I will be at a studio for a major company in Hollywood. In a way I like a challenge. I really think it's necessary to get involved with something new. It's so good to break all your habits. In France I can do anything, here I have to fight. That's a good thing. They respect you if you fight and it keeps you alert.
"I am not trying to make a statement on America", added Vadim. "I tell a story and the story happens to be located in America." Rock Hudson was signed to star, and filming began in August 1970. Brigitte Bardot was offered the female lead but could not get out of a prior commitment; Angie Dickinson played the role instead. The cast included eight young female newcomers, the "pretty maids": Brenda Sykes, Joy Bang, Gretchen Burrell, Joanna Cameron, Aimée Eccles, June Fairchild, Margaret Markov, and Diane Sherry. The film was in production from August 10 to October 25, 1970. It was shot in large part at University High School in West Los Angeles. Some years later, a University High administrator told the Los Angeles Times that the high sexual and violent content of the film should have precluded it from being approved for filming at the school.  Other scenes were shot at Santa Monica Pier and Venice Marina, while the football sequence was filmed at Rancho La Cienega Park using a local football team and school band.

Publicity
The April 1971 issue of Playboy magazine published an article about the movie written by Vadim. This includes a nine-page pictorial of actresses Angie Dickinson, Gretchen Burrell, Aimee Eccles, Margaret Markov, Playboy bunny Joyce Williams, and others.

Reception
The film was poorly received by most critics, with Roger Ebert calling it "embarrassing" and Ken Hanke of Mountain Xpress remarking: "In 1971 this was pretty daring and trendy. Unfortunately, it's no longer 1971."

Quentin Tarantino selected this film as one of his choices for Sight & Sound magazine's 2012 edition of Top 10 Greatest Films of All Time.

See also

 List of American films of 1971

References

External links
 
 
 
 
 
John Landis on Pretty Maids All in a Row at Trailers from Hell

1971 films
1971 comedy-drama films
1970s mystery thriller films
1970s black comedy films
1970s comedy mystery films
1970s serial killer films
American black comedy films
American comedy-drama films
American comedy thriller films
American high school films
1970s English-language films
Films scored by Lalo Schifrin
Films about educators
Films about virginity
Films based on American novels
Films directed by Roger Vadim
Films produced by Gene Roddenberry
Films set in the United States
Films shot in Los Angeles
Metro-Goldwyn-Mayer films
Films with screenplays by Gene Roddenberry
American serial killer films
1970s American films